Bredefjord is a fjord in northeastern Greenland. Administratively it is part of the Northeast Greenland National Park zone.

Tundra climate prevails in the area of the fjord, the average annual temperature in the area being -14° C . The warmest month is July when the average temperature rises to 1° C and the coldest is January with -23° C.

Geography
Bredefjord is oriented in a roughly NW/SE direction and its mouth opens at the junction with the Smallefjord from the west into the Ardencaple Fjord, Hochstetter Bay, Greenland Sea. The large Stormgletscher and Ejnar Mikkelsen glaciers form a confluence at its head.   

Norlund Land, part of Queen Margrethe II Land, lies to the north of the fjord and C. H. Ostenfeld Land to the south.

See also
List of fjords of Greenland

References

External links
The tectonometamorphic development of the Ardencaple Fjord area, North East Greenland Caledonides

Fjords of Greenland